Rami Hamadeh also spelled Rami Hamadi (born 24 March 1994) is a Palestinian footballer who plays as a goalkeeper for the Palestine national football team and Jabal Al-Mukaber in the West Bank Premier League. He is Palestine's all time leader in clean sheets, having recorded 20 over the course of his national team career.

Club career

Hamadeh began his career playing for Hapoel Shfar'am youth team, before moving to Maccabi Netanya.

He signed his first pro contract in 2012, when he joined the Palestinian side Thaqafi Tulkarem. Hamadeh left Tulkarem for a one-season spell at Shabab Al-Khader SC in 2014, before coming back and playing for Tulkarem until 2017. In his final season with Thaqafi Tulkarem, Hamadeh set a record for clean sheets in a season- registering 14 whilst only conceding 19 goals in 22 games. His season also featured a streak of six games without conceding a goal. 

In 2017, Hamadeh signed for Hilal Al-Quds, with which he won the double in 2017-18, and was voted best goalkeeper two years in a row. In his first season with Hilal Al-Quds, Hamadeh set a record for fewest goals conceded in a league season- allowing only 9 in 21 games. 

This success drew the attention of bigger clubs, and in 2020 Hamadeh signed a two-season contract with Israeli Premier League club Bnei Sakhnin.

In March 2021, Hamadeh made history as the first active Israeli Premier League player to be called up to the Palestinian National Team.

For the 2021/22 season, Rami Hamadeh signed with Shabab Al-Khaleel and helped them win the 2021–22 West Bank Premier League title. The goalkeeper broke his own records for most clean sheets in a season, registering 15 while also setting a new mark for fewest goals conceded, seven, in a league campaign.

First Steps

At 17, Hamadeh was called into his first national team youth team. He played three out of four qualifiers for the 2012 AFC U-19 Championship, missing the final qualifier due to yellow card accumulation conceding four goals in three games and making a number of outstanding saves to keep the overmatched Palestinians in games against Syria, UAE, and Lebanon.

In 2012, he was called up to the U-22 side in their quest to qualify for the 2013 AFC U-22 Championship and served as the back-up to Ghanem Mahajneh.

In 2013, he was called up to face Jordan in an unofficial friendly and came on in the 81st minute in place of Ramzi Saleh.

The following year, he made waves in a friendly vs. Brazil, holding the opposition scoreless for 60 minutes and saving a penalty from Ademilson.

Hamadeh was the starting goalkeeper at the 2014 Asian Games in Incheon and played a key role in Palestine winning its first ever games at the competition and advancing to the knockout round for the first time.

International career
In 2015, Hamadeh was the youngest member of Palestine's 2015 AFC Asian Cup squad but did not play. He became Palestine's starting goalkeeper during the 2016/17 season in which he conceded a mere 9 league goals in 21 games for Thaqafi Tulkarem. His first official national team cap came in a friendly vs. Yemen on 22 March 2017. He kept a clean sheet in his first three games- becoming the first Palestinian goalkeeper to do so. In his first 10 national team caps, Hamadeh has kept 6 clean sheets recording six victories, two draws, and two losses.

In 2018, he was called as one of three overage players to Palestine's 2018 Asian Games squad. 

In 2021, Hamadeh surpassed Ramzi Saleh by recording his 17th clean sheet in a World Cup Qualifier against Yemen.

Achievements
 West Bank Premier League
Winner (3): 2017–18, 2018-19, 2021-22
Runner Up (1): 2016-17

 Palestine Cup
Winner (1):2017–18

 Palestine Super CupWinner (2): 2018, 2019Individual WBPL Golden GloveWinner (3): '''2016/17, 2017/18, 2021/22

References

External links

1994 births
Living people
Palestinian footballers
Thaqafi Tulkarem players
Hilal Al-Quds Club players
Bnei Sakhnin F.C. players
Israeli Premier League players
West Bank Premier League players
Footballers from Shefa-'Amr
Palestinian people of Israeli descent
Association football goalkeepers
Palestine international footballers
Footballers at the 2018 Asian Games
Footballers at the 2014 Asian Games
Asian Games competitors for Palestine
2015 AFC Asian Cup players
2019 AFC Asian Cup players
Palestine youth international footballers